Line 28 of the Beijing Subway is a rapid transit line under construction in Beijing. It was formerly known as CBD line.

Construction started in July 2021. It is planned to open in 2025.

List of Stations

History
In August 2015, planning authorities proposed an underground automatic people mover (APM) line through the Central Business District (CBD).

According to the most recent plan announced in August 2019, the line will run , have 9 stations from Dongdaqiao to Guangqudonglu. The line was redesigned into a higher capacity light metro line, not an automatic people mover (APM).

A feasibility study for the line was approved in October 2020.

Construction started in July 2021.

Rolling stock
It will use 6-car Type LB linear motor rolling stock, similar to the Capital Airport Express of Beijing Subway, and Guangzhou Metro's Line 4, Line 5 and Line 6.

References

Beijing Subway lines
Proposed public transport in China
Proposed buildings and structures in Beijing
Linear motor metros